Bart Wayne Conner (born March 28, 1958) is a retired American Olympic gymnast. As a member of the US men's gymnastics team at the 1984 Summer Olympic Games, Conner won two gold medals. He owns and operates the Bart Conner Gymnastics Academy in Norman, Oklahoma, along with his wife, Romanian Olympic gold medalist Nadia Comăneci.  In addition, both Comăneci and Conner are highly involved with the Special Olympics.

Early life and education
Conner was born on March 28, 1958, the son of Harold Conner and Jacqueline May ( Hulsey, later Wolthausen; 1931-2000), and grew up in Morton Grove, Illinois. He has two siblings, Michael and Bruce. He first became involved in gymnastics at school and his local YMCA. He was later on the gymnastics team at Niles West High School, where he graduated in 1976.

He later attended the University of Oklahoma to work with coach Paul Ziert on the gymnastics team. He eventually graduated from OU in 1984, where he was an All-American and won the 1981 Nissen Award as America's best gymnast.

Gymnastics career
He won the 1972 U.S. Junior National Championships when he was 14 and the U.S. Gymnastics Federation All-Around championship when he was 17, and was the youngest member of the Olympic team during the 1976 Summer Olympics. He also won a team all-around gold medal at the 1975 Pan American Games.

Although he qualified for the 1980 Summer Olympics, he was unable to participate due to the boycott. Four years later, in the 1984 Summer Olympics, he won two gold medals for the team all-around and for the men's parallel bars. His win on the parallel bars helped the U.S. win its first men's Olympic gymnastic gold medal in 80 years. He demonstrated an original move called the "Conner spin" during the 1984 Olympics. He appeared as "Bart Taylor" in the 1986 film Rad.

Honors
Conner is a highly decorated gymnast who has won "medals at every level of national and international competition." Some of his honors include "induction into the USOC Olympic Hall of Fame (1991), the USA Gymnastics Hall of Fame (1996), Oklahoma Sports Hall of Fame (1997), and the International Gymnastics Hall of Fame (1997)." While Connor did not compete in the 1980 games, he was one of 461 athletes to receive a Congressional Gold Medal many years later.

Personal life
On November 27, 1989, Nadia Comăneci, the famous Romanian gymnast Conner had met at the 1976 Montreal games, defected from Romania with a group of other Romanians. In January 1990, when Conner read in the newspaper that she was scheduled to be interviewed on  The Pat Sajak Show, he contacted the producer and arranged to make a guest appearance on the show. Conner liked the idea of surprising  Comăneci: "I'm thinking if she's going to be on Sajak, I might as well go out there and say, 'Hey, Nads,' "  Actually, Comăneci was in an abusive relationship with the person who had led the escape group and who was acting as her current manager and promoter.  Conner sensed her fear of this person and reached out to help.  According to a 1996 New York Times article, "He helped make the connections that eventually led to her escape from that abusive relationship, and a new life in Montreal with a Romanian rugby coach and his family. For a year, they were phone pals."

Later in 1990, Conner interviewed her for ABC. A few months later, Conner was invited to her 29th birthday party, after which they developed a long-distance friendship. When a mutual friend died in an accident in 1991, Conner invited Comăneci to come to Oklahoma to help him run a gymnastics school. They were together for four years before they became engaged. On April 27, 1996, Conner and Comăneci were married in a ceremony in Bucharest that was televised live throughout Romania. Their wedding reception was held in the former presidential palace. Conner and Comăneci have one child, a son named Dylan Paul Conner who was born on June 3, 2006, in Oklahoma City, Oklahoma.

Books
Conner, Bart with Paul Ziert. Winning the Gold. Warner Books, 1985.

See also

References

Cited sources

External links

 
 
 
 
 Voices of Oklahoma interview with Bart Conner. First person interview conducted on February 28, 2013, with Bart Conner. 
 

Video clips:
 The Adorable Way This Olympic Couple First Met | Where Are They Now | Oprah Winfrey Network - Oprah Winfrey Network (U.S. TV channel), 2016
 Nadia Comaneci & Bart Conner Commentate on Their Perfect Olympic Routines | Take the Mic – The Olympic Channel, 2016
 Nadia Comaneci and Bart Conner, 11 Olympic Medals in this Olympic Family – The Olympic Channel, 2016

1958 births
Living people
American male artistic gymnasts
Gymnastics broadcasters
Gymnasts at the 1976 Summer Olympics
Gymnasts at the 1984 Summer Olympics
Medalists at the 1984 Summer Olympics
Medalists at the World Artistic Gymnastics Championships
Oklahoma Sooners men's gymnasts
Olympic gold medalists for the United States in gymnastics
Pan American Games bronze medalists for the United States
Pan American Games medalists in gymnastics
Special Olympics
Sportspeople from Chicago
World champion gymnasts
Congressional Gold Medal recipients
Gymnasts at the 1975 Pan American Games
Medalists at the 1975 Pan American Games